Dako Radošević (17 August 1934 – 14 August 2021) was a Bosnian discus thrower. He was born in Bosanska Krupa, Yugoslavia and competed for Yugoslavia in the 1956 Summer Olympics and in the 1964 Summer Olympics.

References

1934 births
2021 deaths
Bosnia and Herzegovina male discus throwers
Olympic athletes of Yugoslavia
Athletes (track and field) at the 1956 Summer Olympics
Athletes (track and field) at the 1964 Summer Olympics
People from Bosanska Krupa
Yugoslav male discus throwers
Mediterranean Games gold medalists for Yugoslavia
Mediterranean Games medalists in athletics
Athletes (track and field) at the 1963 Mediterranean Games